Jochen Bohl (born 19 April 1950 in Lüdenscheid) is the bishop of the Evangelical-Lutheran Church of Saxony having been in office since 2004. One of his most memorable moments was the reconsecration of the rebuilt Frauenkirche in Dresden in October 2005. Since 9 November 2010, he has been vice president of the council of the Evangelical Church in Germany (EKD).

External links 

 Official biography of bishop Bohl at landeskirche-sachsen.de

References

1950 births
Living people
Clergy from Dresden
21st-century German Lutheran bishops